Cliff Dwellers Airport or Cliff Dwellers Lodge Airport  is a private use non-towered airport owned by the Bureau of Land Management located  southwest of Marble Canyon Airport and the town of Marble Canyon, in Coconino County, Arizona, United States.

Although most U.S. airports use the same three-letter location identifier for the FAA, IATA, and ICAO, this airport is only assigned  AZ03 by the FAA.

Facilities and aircraft 
It has one runway:
 4/22 measuring  dirt

For the 12-month period ending April 23, 2015, the airport had three aircraft based at this airport: 100% single-engine.

References

External links 
 

Airports in Coconino County, Arizona